is the thirteenth film installment of the Case Closed manga and anime series. The film was released in Japan on April 18, 2009. This film earned 3.9 billion yen in the domestic Japanese box office, making it the highest-grossing film in the Case Closed series. The film involves active members of the Black Organization, making this the Black Organization's second appearance in a film since Countdown to Heaven. A special preview to the film aired in Japan on Animax. A new member from the Black Organization that shrunk Shinichi's body manages to find out about Shinichi's transformation into Conan. This discovery starts to put those around him in danger as Gin and the other Black Organization members start to take action. The film was nominated for Best Animated Film at the 2010 Awards of the Japanese Academy.

Plot
The film begins with Conan having a nightmare where Gin and Vodka discover his true identity in Mouri's office and Vodka shoots Ran, but Conan awakes. In real life, a man driving down a hillside road realizes that his car's brakes have failed. The car crashes into a toll booth, killing the man. He leaves a dying message: "Tanabata kyo." A Mahjong tile next to his body links this case to six others in Tokyo, Kanagawa, Shizuoka, Nagano, and other Japanese prefectures. Because of the Mahjong tiles left beside each victim, the police conclude that the same person or organization committed these murders. The police across Japan unite to solve the serial murder case.

After a police conference about this case, Conan discovers a police officer entering a black Porsche 356A owned by Gin. He concludes that a Black Organization member disguised as an officer has infiltrated the meeting. On Tanabata, Conan corners Vermouth in the underground parking lot of a shopping mall. She reveals that the Black Organization needs a memory chip, which the murderer took, and a new member, "Irish".

Conan employs the help of Heiji Hattori to solve the case by following the dying message lead. He and Heiji find out that two years ago, in Kyoto, an accidental fire in a hotel killed a young woman named Nanako Honjou. The elevator could only hold seven, but eight needed to evacuate. Nanako was not on the last elevator and did not escape.

Conan tracks down her neighbor, Shun Sawamura, and asks him some questions. He finds out that Nanako and her boyfriend, Kousuke Mizutani, often went stargazing together. Conan realizes that the crime scenes are ordered like the star constellation Ursa Major, making the last crime scene Shiba Park. The police also figure out the pattern and leave for Tokyo Tower.

Conan confronts Mizutani, who is about to commit suicide in Nanako's memory and to avoid arrest. Mizutani thought one of the seven had pushed Nanako out, but Nanako's brother, Kazuki Honjou, shows up and testifies that he had overheard two survivors say that Nanako voluntarily stepped out. Conan reveals that the murderer is Kazuki because Mizutani would not murder to stain the memory of Nanako. He tells Mizutani that the survivors appreciated Nanako's sacrifice and sent flowers to her memorial. Kazuki lied to manipulate Mizutani into avenging Nanako but did it himself after realizing that Mizutani would not. Mizutani realizes that Nanako would not have wanted him to commit suicide and returns the victims' belongings to Kazuki, who would have used the evidence to convict Mizutani. Kazuki threatens Conan and Mizutani with a knife. Matsumoto appears and shoots the knife out of Kazuki's hands.

Conan realizes that Matsumoto is Irish in disguise. Irish claims that he does not want to kill Conan. He says he discovered Conan's true identity, having matched his and Shinichi's fingerprints, and wants to turn him in to the "boss" alive. The "boss" would know of Gin's mistake and punish Gin, satisfying Irish's revenge against him for killing his friend Pisco. Conan wants the memory chip, but Irish refuses to hand it over. Ran arrives at Tokyo Tower and finds Irish still disguised as Matsumoto. She uses karate, but a kick to his face tears off part of his mask. Taking advantage of her surprise, Irish overpowers Ran.

Irish and Conan move outside near the top, and a helicopter with Gin, Vodka, Korn, and Chianti arrives. Irish shows them the chip, and Gin orders Chianti to shoot Irish and the chip. The bullet seriously injured Irish. Conan tries to drag him to safety, but Gin notices Conan and tries to shoot him. Irish shields Conan and dies.

The Black Organization attacks with a machine gun, damaging the Tokyo Tower. Cornered, Conan escapes by slinging a skylight with his expanding suspenders at the helicopter, damaging the engine. The Black Organization manages to fly away, but the helicopter crashes. Conan later discovers that the members escaped the helicopter before it crashed and vows to take down the organization once and for all.

Professor Agasa and the Detective Boys free the real Matsumoto from a small house in Beika Woods with the help of Officer Satou and Takagi.

Cast
Minami Takayama as Conan Edogawa
Kappei Yamaguchi as Shinichi Kudo
Akira Kamiya as Kogoro Mori
Wakana Yamazaki as Ran Mori
Megumi Hayashibara as Ai Haibara
Yukitoshi Hori as Gin
Chafurin as Inspector Megure
Atsuko Yuya as Officer Sato
Masashi Sugawara as Kazuki Honjo
Fumiko Orikasa as Nanako Honjo
Yuko Miyamura as Kazuha Tōyama
Yuuji Takada as Kansuke Yamato
Naoko Matsui as Sonoko Suzuki
Ryo Horikawa as Heiji Hattori
Ryotaro Okiayu as Fumimaro Ayanokoji
Seizō Katō as Kiyonaga Matsumoto
Toshio Furukawa as Misao Yamamura
Wataru Takagi as Genta Kojima and Officer Takagi
Yukiko Iwai as Ayumi Yoshida
Akio Ōtsuka as Juugo Yokomizu / Sango Yokomizu
Ami Koshimizu as Yui Euhara
Fumihiko Tachiki as Vodka
Hiroyuki Kinoshita as Korn
Ikue Ohtani as Mitsuhiko Tsuburaya
Isshin Chiba as Officer Chiba
Kazuhiko Inoue as Ninzaburou Shiratori
Kenichi Ogata as Professor Agasa
Kikuko Inoue as Chianti
Mami Koyama as Vermouth
Daigo as Kosuke Mizutani
Nana Mizuki as Risa Yoshi
Nobutoshi Canna as Shun Sawamura
Tomohiro Nishimura as Minoru Fukase
Yuji Mikimoto as Irish

Soundtrack
The film's theme song is "PUZZLE" by Mai Kuraki. It was released along with music for the broadcast anime's 25th opening "Revive" as double A-side singles on April 1, 2009. Along with Countdown to Heaven and Crossroad in the Ancient Capital, The Raven Chaser is the third Case Closed film in which Mai Kuraki wrote the theme song.

The official soundtrack was released on April 4, 2009. It costs approximately ¥2857, ¥3000 with tax included; 31.46 USD.

DVD
The standard edition DVD was released on November 25, 2009.

Three versions are to be released: the limited DVD version will include 2 discs with the film, the trailer, Magic File #3, and other extras with 5.1 Dolby Digital HD Surround Sound audio. The regular DVD will only include the film and the trailer with 5.1 Dolby Digital HD Surround Sound audio. The Blu-ray version includes the HD format of the regular DVD version. The limited DVD cost ¥6720, the regular DVD cost ¥5460, and the Blu-ray version cost ¥6510. The DVD will only be released in Japan, Europe, Middle East, and South Africa.

Reception

The Blu-ray Disc release was awarded the Best Interactivity Award by Digital Entertainment Group Japan.

References

External links
 
Official TMS website  
Official NTV website  
Official TMS website  

2009 anime films
TMS Entertainment
Toho films
Films directed by Yasuichiro Yamamoto
2000s Japanese-language films
Raven Chaser
Animated films set in Tokyo